Hyotissa semiplana is an extinct species of large saltwater oysters, a fossil marine bivalve mollusk in the family Gryphaeidae, the foam oysters

Description
They have thick-walled valves, with rough, nodose surface.

Distribution
Fossils of this species have been found in the Campanian-Maestrichtian of Poland, in the Santonian-Maestrichtian of Europe and North Africa and in the Campanian of South India.

References

Gryphaeidae
Bivalves described in 1825